Orlem is a neighbourhood in Malad, a suburb of Mumbai. Its original name in the official language of the state (Marathi) is Valnai, a term used to describe the area as "Valan" meaning turn or curve. The village was settled on a path that curved. The postal zip code 400064 serves the neighborhood. According to a Church census conducted in 2004, it was the largest parish in the Archdiocese of Bombay.

Location
Orlem is situated at the northern part of Mumbai in the western suburb of Malad. It branches from the main road called Marve Road, which is the main route to Marve beach from Swami Vivekanand Road. It is accessible from the Malad Railway station through the bus routes 210, 243, 270, 271, 272, 273, 281,345, 622 and 707

Landmarks
Our Lady of Lourdes Church , established in 1916, is also known as Orlem Church. Many major B.E.S.T. bus routes stop here and some routes terminate here.

Localities
Major zones in Orlem:
 Dominic Colony and Tank Colony
 Joe Braz Colony (J.B.C.)
 Lourdes Colony
 Baudi
 Mithchowki
 Evershine Nagar
 Somwar Bazar & Liberty Garden
 D'monte Lane

Orlem is the channel for many Mumbai beaches such as Marve Beach, Aksa Beach, Madh Island, Erangal, and Dana Pani.

Demographics
Orlem was traditionally inhabited by the East Indians, Koli and SKP communities. According to a 2004 Church census, there were around 7,000 Tamil Catholics in the parish. With the huge boom of the call centre service industry in the 2000s, Orlem witnessed a large influx of young working class executives.

Business
Many businesses have grown in and around Orlem. Famous restaurants like Uncle's Kitchen, and shopping malls such as 'Inorbit Mall', 'Hypercity', 'D-Mart' & the new 'Infinity Mall' are close to Orlem.

Education
The major schools in Orlem are St. Anne's High School and Junior College, St. Anne International School, Shri Balaji International School, Carmel Of St. Joseph, and St. Joseph's School.

Sports
Orlem is home to a vibrant sporting community, predominantly in the fields of hockey and football.

Popular culture
The writer Lindsay Pereira's debut novel, Gods and Ends, is the first to be set in Orlem. It was published by Penguin Random House in March, 2021, and focuses on the Goan Catholic community, as well as the East Indian and Mangalorean population of the suburb. The book was described in The Hindu as "a stark and fearless portrayal of the Roman Catholic community in the Bombay of yore."

References

Neighbourhoods in Mumbai
Villages in Mumbai Suburban district